Toritto (Barese:  or ) is a town and comune in the Metropolitan City of Bari and region of Apulia, southern Italy.

It lies in an agricultural area, growing mainly almond and olive trees, about 20 km from the Adriatic Sea.

History
The origins of the city are uncertain, but they probably date to around 800 AD, although the first document testifying to the existence of Toritto is from 1069. A parish existed in 1171.

Main sights
Torre dell'Orologio (Watchtower), with a 1564 inscription.
Chiesa Madre (Mother Church), built in 1410 and entitled to St. Nicholas.
Chiesa della Madonna della Stella, erected before 1092.

References

External links 
 

Cities and towns in Apulia